Philipp Oswald and Andreas Siljeström were the defending champions, but Oswald did not participate that year, and Siljeström played alongside Roman Jebavý, but they lost in the final to Patrick Grigoriu and Costin Pavăl, 6–7(4–7), 7–6(7–4), [5–10].

Seeds

Draw

Draw

References
 Main Draw

Internazionali di Tennis Castel del Monte - Doubles
2014 Doubles
2014 in Italian tennis